Muslim Quarter may refer to:

Muslim Quarter (Jerusalem)
Xi'an Muslim Quarter